Jonathan's Space Report (JSR) is a newsletter about the Space Age, hosted at Jonathan's Space Page. It is written by Jonathan McDowell, a Center for Astrophysics  Harvard & Smithsonian astrophysicist. It is updated as McDowell's schedule permits, but he tries to publish two issues each month. Originally the website was hosted on a Harvard University account, but was moved in late 2003 to a dedicated domain.

Started in 1989, the newsletter reports on recent space launches, International Space Station activities and space craft developments. McDowell's report occasionally corrects NASA's official web sites, or provides additional data on classified launches that aren't available elsewhere.

Associated projects on the JSR web site are:
 A catalog of all known geosynchronous satellites and their current positions
 A listing of satellite launch attempts
 A cross-reference between catalog number and international designation of artificial satellites

McDowell has long campaigned for U.S. compliance with the UN Convention on Registration of Outer Space Objects (1975) and UN Resolution 1721B (1961).

See also
 Encyclopedia Astronautica

References

External links
 

Newsletters
Spaceflight
Publications established in 1989
Internet properties established in 1989
Space Age